Cyrtodactylus hoskini  is a species of gecko, a lizard in the family Gekkonidae. The species is endemic to Australia.

Etymology
The specific name, hoskini, is in honor of Australian herpetologist Conrad J. Hoskin.

Geographic range
C. hoskini is found in northern Queensland, Australia.

Habitat
The preferred natural habitats of C. hoskini are forest and rocky areas.

Description

Reproduction
The mode of reproduction of C. hoskini is unknown.

References

Further reading
Cogger HG (2014). Reptiles and Amphibians of Australia, Seventh Edition. Clayton, Victoria, Australia: CSIRO Publishing. xxx + 1,033 pp. .
Shea G, Couper P, Wilmer JW, Amey P (2011). "Revision of the genus Cyrtodactylus Gray, 1827 (Squamata: Gekkonidae) in Australia". Zootaxa 3146 (1): 1–63. (Cyrtodactylus hoskini, new species).
Wilson S, Swan G (2013). A Complete Guide to Reptiles of Australia, Fourth Edition. Sydney: New Holland Publishers. 522 pp. .

Cyrtodactylus
Reptiles described in 2011
Taxa named by Glenn Michael Shea
Taxa named by Patrick J. Couper
Taxa named by Jessica Worthington Wilmer
Taxa named by Andrew P. Amey